

Events

Pre-1600
1074 – Battle of Mogyoród: Dukes Géza and Ladislaus defeat their cousin Solomon, King of Hungary, forcing him to flee to Hungary's western borderland. 
1590 – Battle of Ivry: Henry of Navarre and the Huguenots defeat the forces of the Catholic League under Charles, Duke of Mayenne, during the French Wars of Religion.

1601–1900
1647 – Thirty Years' War: Bavaria, Cologne, France and Sweden sign the Truce of Ulm.
1663 – According to his own account, Otto von Guericke completes his book Experimenta Nova (ut vocantur) Magdeburgica de Vacuo Spatio, detailing his experiments on vacuum and his discovery of electrostatic repulsion.
1674 – The Third Anglo-Dutch War: The Battle of Ronas Voe results in the Dutch East India Company ship Wapen van Rotterdam being captured with a death toll of up to 300 Dutch crew and soldiers.
1757 – Admiral Sir John Byng is executed by firing squad aboard  for breach of the Articles of War.
1780 – American Revolutionary War: Spanish forces capture Fort Charlotte in Mobile, Alabama, the last British frontier post capable of threatening New Orleans.
1794 – Eli Whitney is granted a patent for the cotton gin.
1885 – The Mikado, a light opera by W. S. Gilbert and Arthur Sullivan, receives its first public performance at the Savoy Theatre in London.
1900 – The Gold Standard Act is ratified, placing the United States currency on the gold standard.

1901–present
1901 – Utah governor Heber Manning Wells vetoes a bill that would have eased restriction on polygamy. 
1903 – Pelican Island National Wildlife Refuge, the first national wildlife refuge in the US, is established by President Theodore Roosevelt.
1920 – In the second of the 1920 Schleswig plebiscites, about 80% of the population in Zone II votes to remain part of Weimar Germany.
1926 – The El Virilla train accident, Costa Rica, kills 248 people and wounds another 93 when a train falls off a bridge over the Río Virilla between Heredia and Tibás.
1931 – Alam Ara, India's first talking film, is released.
1939 – Slovakia declares independence under German pressure.
1942 – Anne Miller becomes the first American patient to be treated with penicillin, under the care of Orvan Hess and John Bumstead.
1943 – The Holocaust: The liquidation of the Kraków Ghetto is completed.
1945 – The R.A.F. drop the Grand Slam bomb in action for the first time, on a railway viaduct near Bielefeld, Germany.
1951 – Korean War: United Nations troops recapture Seoul for the second time.
1961 – A USAF B-52 bomber crashes near Yuba City, California whilst carrying nuclear weapons.
1964 – Jack Ruby is convicted of killing Lee Harvey Oswald, the assumed assassin of John F. Kennedy.
1967 – The body of U.S. President John F. Kennedy is moved to a permanent burial place at Arlington National Cemetery.
1972 – Sterling Airways Flight 296 crashes near Kalba, United Arab Emirates while on approach to Dubai International Airport, killing 112 people.
1978 – The Israel Defense Forces launch Operation Litani, a seven-day campaign to invade and occupy southern Lebanon.
1979 – Alia Royal Jordanian Flight 600 crashes at Doha International Airport, killing 45 people.
1980 – LOT Polish Airlines Flight 007 crashes during final approach near Warsaw, Poland, killing 87 people, including a 14-man American boxing team.
1982 – The South African government bombs the headquarters of the African National Congress in London. 
1988 – In the Johnson South Reef Skirmish Chinese forces defeat Vietnamese forces in an altercation over control of one of the Spratly Islands.
1995 – Norman Thagard becomes the first American astronaut to ride to space on board a Russian launch vehicle.
2006 – The 2006 Chadian coup d'état attempt ends in failure.
  2006   – Operation Bringing Home the Goods: Israeli troops raid an American-supervised Palestinian prison in Jericho to capture six Palestinian prisoners, including PFLP chief Ahmad Sa'adat.
2007 – The Nandigram violence in Nandigram, West Bengal, results in the deaths of at least 14 people.
2008 – A series of riots, protests, and demonstrations erupt in Lhasa and subsequently spread elsewhere in Tibet.
2017 – A naming ceremony for the chemical element nihonium takes place in Tokyo, with then Crown Prince Naruhito in attendance.
2019 – Cyclone Idai makes landfall near Beira, Mozambique, causing devastating floods and over 1,000 deaths.
2021 – Burmese security forces kill at least 65 civilians in the Hlaingthaya massacre.

Births

Pre-1600
None

1601–1900
1638 – Johann Georg Gichtel, German mystic (d. 1710)
1737 – Ioan Nicolidi of Pindus, Aromanian physician and noble (d. 1828)
1790 – Ludwig Emil Grimm, German painter and engraver (d. 1863)
1800 – James Bogardus, American inventor and architect (d. 1874)
1801 – Kristjan Jaak Peterson, Estonian poet (d. 1822)
1804 – Johann Strauss I, Austrian composer and conductor (d. 1849)
1813 – Joseph P. Bradley, American lawyer and jurist (d. 1892)
1820 – Victor Emmanuel II of Italy (d. 1878)
1822 – Teresa Cristina of the Two Sicilies (d. 1889)
1823 – Théodore de Banville, French poet and critic (d. 1891)
1833 – Frederic Shields, English painter and illustrator (d. 1911)
  1833   – Lucy Hobbs Taylor, American dentist and educator (d. 1910)
1835 – Giovanni Schiaparelli, Italian astronomer and historian (d. 1910)
1836 – Isabella Beeton, English author of Mrs Beeton's Book of Household Management (d. 1865)
1837 – Charles Ammi Cutter, American librarian (d. 1903)
1844 – Umberto I of Italy (d. 1900)
  1844   – Arthur O'Shaughnessy, English poet and herpetologist (d. 1881)
1847 – Castro Alves, Brazilian poet and playwright (d. 1871)
1853 – Ferdinand Hodler, Swiss painter (d. 1918)
1854 – Paul Ehrlich, German physician and biologist, Nobel Prize laureate (d. 1915)
  1854   – John Lane, English publisher, co-founded The Bodley Head (d. 1925)
  1854   – Alexandru Macedonski, Romanian author and poet (d. 1920)
  1854   – Thomas R. Marshall, American lawyer and politician, 28th Vice President of the United States of America (d. 1925)
1862 – Vilhelm Bjerknes, Norwegian physicist and meteorologist (d. 1951)
1864 – Casey Jones, American engineer (d. 1900)
1868 – Emily Murphy, Canadian jurist, author, and activist (d. 1933)
1869 – Algernon Blackwood, English author and playwright (d. 1951)
1874 – Anton Philips, Dutch businessman, co-founded Philips Electronics (d. 1951)
1879 – Albert Einstein, German-American physicist, engineer, and academic, Nobel Prize laureate (d. 1955)
1882 – Wacław Sierpiński, Polish mathematician and academic (d. 1969)
1885 – Raoul Lufbery, French-American soldier and pilot (d. 1918)
1886 – Firmin Lambot, Belgian cyclist (d. 1964)
1887 – Sylvia Beach, American-French bookseller and publisher, who founded Shakespeare and Company (d. 1962)
1898 – Reginald Marsh, French-American painter and illustrator (d. 1954)
1899 – K. C. Irving, Canadian businessman, founded Irving Oil (d. 1992)

1901–present
1901 – Sid Atkinson, South African hurdler and long jumper (d. 1977)
1903 – Adolph Gottlieb, American painter and sculptor (d. 1974)
1904 – Doris Eaton Travis, American actress and dancer (d. 2010)
1905 – Raymond Aron, French journalist, sociologist, and philosopher (d. 1983)
1906 – Ulvi Cemal Erkin, Turkish composer and educator (d. 1972)
1908 – Ed Heinemann, American designer of military aircraft (d. 1991)
  1908   – Maurice Merleau-Ponty, French philosopher and academic (d. 1961)
  1908   – Philip Conrad Vincent, English engineer and businessman, founded Vincent Motorcycles (d. 1979)
1911 – Akira Yoshizawa, Japanese origamist (d. 2005)
1912 – Cliff Bastin, English footballer (d. 1991)
  1912   – Les Brown, American saxophonist, composer, and bandleader (d. 2001)
  1912   – W. Graham Claytor, Jr. American lieutenant, lawyer, and politician, 15th United States Secretary of the Navy (d. 1994)
  1912   – W. Willard Wirtz, American lawyer and politician, 10th United States Secretary of Labor (d. 2010)
1914 – Lee Hays, American singer-songwriter (d. 1981)
  1914   – Bill Owen, English actor and songwriter (d. 1999)
  1914   – Lee Petty, American race car driver and businessman, founded Petty Enterprises (d. 2000)
1915 – Alexander Brott, Canadian violinist, composer, and conductor (d. 2005)
1916 – Horton Foote, American author, playwright, and screenwriter (d. 2009)
1917 – Alan Smith, English lieutenant and pilot (d. 2013)
1918 – Zoia Horn, American librarian (d. 2014) 
1919 – Max Shulman, American author and screenwriter (d. 1988)
1920 – Hank Ketcham, American author and cartoonist, created Dennis the Menace (d. 2001)
  1920   – Dorothy Tyler-Odam, English high jumper (d. 2014)
1921 – S. Truett Cathy, American businessman, founded Chick-fil-A (d. 2014)
  1921   – Ada Louise Huxtable, American author and critic (d. 2013)
1922 – Les Baxter, American pianist and composer (d. 1996)
1923 – Diane Arbus, American photographer (d. 1971)
1925 – William Clay Ford, Sr., American businessman (d. 2014)
  1925   – Joseph A. Unanue, American sergeant and businessman (d. 2013)
1926 – François Morel, Canadian pianist, composer, conductor, and educator (d. 2018)
1928 – Frank Borman, American colonel, pilot, and astronaut
  1928   – Félix Rodríguez de la Fuente, Spanish environmentalist (d. 1980)
1929 – Bob Goalby, American golfer (d. 2022)
1932 – Mark Murphy, American singer-songwriter and actor (d. 2015)
  1932   – Naina Yeltsina, Russian wife of Boris Yeltsin, First Lady of Russia
1933 – Michael Caine, English actor
  1933   – Quincy Jones, American singer-songwriter, trumpet player, and producer
1934 – Eugene Cernan, American captain, pilot, and astronaut (d. 2017)
  1934   – Paul Rader, American 15th General of The Salvation Army
1936 – Bob Charles, New Zealand golfer
1937 – Peter van der Merwe, South African cricketer and referee (d. 2013)
1938 – Eleanor Bron, English actress and screenwriter
  1938   – Jan Crouch, American televangelist, co-founder of the Trinity Broadcasting Network (d. 2016)
  1938   – John Gleeson, Australian cricketer (d. 2016)
  1938   – Árpád Orbán, Hungarian footballer (d. 2008)
1939 – Raymond J. Barry, American actor
  1939   – Bertrand Blier, French director and screenwriter
  1939   – Yves Boisset, French director and screenwriter
1941 – Wolfgang Petersen, German-American director, producer, and screenwriter (d. 2022)
1942 – Rita Tushingham, English actress
1943 – Anita Morris, American actress and singer (d. 1994)
1944 – Boris Brott, Canadian composer and conductor
  1944   – Václav Nedomanský, Czech ice hockey player and manager
  1944   – Bobby Smith, English footballer and manager
  1944   – Tom Stannage, Australian historian and academic (d. 2012)
1945 – Jasper Carrott, English comedian, actor, and game show host
  1945   – Michael Martin Murphey, American singer-songwriter and guitarist 	
  1945   – Walter Parazaider, American saxophonist
1946 – William Lerach, American securities and class action attorney
  1946   – Wes Unseld, American basketball player, coach, and manager (d. 2020)
1947 – Roy Budd, English pianist and composer (d. 1993)
  1947   – William J. Jefferson, American lawyer and politician
  1947   – Jona Lewie, English singer-songwriter and keyboard player
1948 – Tom Coburn, American physician and politician (d. 2020)
  1948   – Billy Crystal, American actor, director, producer, and screenwriter
  1948   – Theo Jansen, Dutch sculptor
1950 – Rick Dees, American actor and radio host
1951 – Jerry Greenfield, American businessman and philanthropist, co-founded Ben & Jerry's
1953 – Nick Keir, Scottish singer-songwriter (d. 2013)
1955 – Jonathan Kaufer, American director and screenwriter (d. 2013)
1956 – Indu Malhotra, Judge of the Supreme Court of India
  1956   – Butch Wynegar, American baseball player and coach
1957 – Tad Williams, American author
1958 – Albert II, Prince of Monaco
1959 – Laila Robins, American actress
  1959   – Tamara Tunie, American actress
1960 – Heidi Hammel, American astronomer and academic
  1960   – Kirby Puckett, American baseball player (d. 2006)
1961 – Garry Jack, Australian rugby league player and coach
  1961   – Mike Lazaridis, Greek–Canadian businessman and philanthropist, founded BlackBerry Limited
1963 – Bruce Reid, Australian cricketer and coach
1965 – Kevin Brown, American baseball player and coach
  1965   – Aamir Khan, Indian film actor, producer, and director
  1965   – Billy Sherwood, American guitarist, songwriter, and producer
  1965   – Kevin Williamson, American actor, director, producer, and screenwriter
1966 – Jonas Elmer, Danish actor, director, and screenwriter
  1966   – Elise Neal, American actress and producer
1968 – Megan Follows, Canadian-American actress
1969 – Larry Johnson, American basketball player and actor
1970 – Kristian Bush, American singer-songwriter and guitarist
1972 – Irom Chanu Sharmila, Indian poet and activist
1973 – Rohit Shetty, Indian film director and producer
1974 – Santino Marella, Canadian professional wrestler
  1974   – Patrick Traverse, Canadian ice hockey player
1975 – Steve Harper, English footballer and referee
  1975   – Dmitri Markov, Belarusian-Australian pole vaulter
1976 – Phil Vickery, English rugby player and sportscaster
1977 – Vadims Fjodorovs, Latvian footballer and coach
  1977   – Naoki Matsuda, Japanese footballer (d. 2011)
  1977   – Jeremy Paul, New Zealand-Australian rugby player
1978 – Pieter van den Hoogenband, Dutch swimmer
1979 – Nicolas Anelka, French footballer and manager
  1979   – Chris Klein, American actor
  1979   – Sead Ramović, German-Bosnian footballer
1980 – Aaron Brown, English footballer and coach
  1980   – Ben Herring, New Zealand rugby player
1981 – Bobby Jenks, American baseball player
  1981   – George Wilson, American football player
1982 – Carlos Marinelli, Argentinian footballer
  1982   – François Sterchele, Belgian footballer (d. 2008)
1983 – Bakhtiyar Artayev, Kazakh boxer
1986 – Elton Chigumbura, Zimbabwean cricketer
  1986   – Jessica Gallagher, Australian skier and cyclist
  1986   – Andy Taylor, English footballer
1988 – Stephen Curry, American basketball player
  1988   – Rico Freimuth, German decathlete
1989 – Kevin Lacroix, Canadian race car driver
1990 – Joe Allen, Welsh footballer
  1990   – Tamás Kádár, Hungarian footballer
  1990   – Haru Kuroki, Japanese actress
  1990   – Kolbeinn Sigþórsson, Icelandic footballer
1991 – Emir Bekrić, Serbian hurdler
  1991   – László Szűcs, Hungarian footballer
  1991   – Steven Zellner, German footballer
1993 – Philipp Ziereis, German footballer
1994 – Ansel Elgort, American actor and DJ
1996 – Batuhan Altıntaş, Turkish footballer
1997 – Simone Biles, American gymnast
2000 – Paige Rini, Canadian water skier
2008 – Abby Ryder Fortson, American actress

Deaths

Pre-1600
 840 – Einhard, Frankish scholar
 968 – Matilda of Ringelheim, Saxon queen (b. c. 896)
1555 – John Russell, 1st Earl of Bedford (b. 1485)

1601–1900
1647 – Frederick Henry, Prince of Orange (b. 1584)
1648 – Ferdinando Fairfax, 2nd Lord Fairfax of Cameron, English general and politician (b. 1584)
1696 – Jean Domat, French lawyer and jurist (b. 1625)
1748 – George Wade, Irish field marshal and politician (b. 1673)
1757 – John Byng, British admiral and politician, 11th Commodore Governor of Newfoundland (b. 1704)
1791 – Johann Salomo Semler, German historian and critic (b. 1725)
1803 – Friedrich Gottlieb Klopstock, German poet (b. 1724)
1811 – Augustus FitzRoy, 3rd Duke of Grafton, English academic and politician, Prime Minister of the United Kingdom (b. 1735)
1823 – Charles François Dumouriez, French general and politician, French Minister of War (b. 1739)
1860 – Carl Ritter von Ghega, Italian engineer, designed the Semmering railway (b. 1802)
1877 – Juan Manuel de Rosas, Argentinian general and politician, 17th Governor of Buenos Aires Province (b. 1793)
1883 – Karl Marx, German philosopher and theorist (b. 1818)
1884 – Quintino Sella, Italian economist and politician, Italian Minister of Finances (b. 1827)

1901–present
1921 – Bernard Ryan executed Irish republican (b. 1901)
1923 – Charlie Daly, Executed Irish republican (b. 1896)
1932 – George Eastman, American inventor and businessman, founded Eastman Kodak (b. 1854)
  1932   – Frederick Jackson Turner, American historian (b. 1861)
1941 – C. R. M. F. Cruttwell, English historian (b. 1887)
1953 – Klement Gottwald, Czechoslovak Communist politician and 14th President of Czechoslovakia (b. 1896)
1957 – Evagoras Pallikarides, Cypriot activist (b. 1938)
1965 – Marion Jones Farquhar, American tennis player (b. 1879)
1968 – Erwin Panofsky, German historian and academic (b. 1892)
1969 – Ben Shahn, Lithuanian-American painter, illustrator, and educator (b. 1898)
1973 – Howard H. Aiken, American computer scientist and engineer (b. 1900)
  1973   – Chic Young, American cartoonist (b. 1901)
1975 – Susan Hayward, American actress (b. 1917)
1976 – Busby Berkeley, American director and choreographer (b. 1895)
1977 – Fannie Lou Hamer, American activist and philanthropist (b. 1917)
1980 – Mohammad Hatta, Indonesian politician, 3rd Prime Minister of Indonesia (b. 1902)
  1980   – Félix Rodríguez de la Fuente, Spanish environmentalist (b. 1928)
1984 – Hovhannes Shiraz, Armenian poet (b. 1915)
1989 – Zita of Bourbon-Parma, Empress of Austria and Queen of Hungary (b. 1892)
1991 – Howard Ashman, American playwright and composer (b. 1950)
1995 – William Alfred Fowler, American physicist and astronomer, Nobel Prize laureate (b. 1911)
1997 – Fred Zinnemann, Austrian-American director and producer (b. 1907)
1999 – Kirk Alyn, American actor (b. 1910)
  1999   – John Broome, American author (b. 1913)
2003 – Jack Goldstein, Canadian-American painter (b. 1945)
  2003   – Jean-Luc Lagardère, French engineer and businessman (b. 1928)
2006 – Lennart Meri, Estonian director and politician, 2nd President of Estonia (b. 1929)
2007 – Lucie Aubrac, French educator and activist (b. 1912)
2008 – Chiara Lubich, Italian activist, co-founded the Focolare Movement (b. 1920)
2010 – Peter Graves, American actor (b. 1926)
2012 – Pierre Schoendoerffer, French director and screenwriter (b. 1928)
  2012   – Ċensu Tabone, Maltese general and politician, 4th President of Malta (b. 1913)
2013 – Jack Greene, American singer-songwriter and guitarist (b. 1930)
  2013   – Aramais Sahakyan, Armenian poet and author (b. 1936)
  2013   – Ieng Sary, Vietnamese-Cambodian politician, Cambodian Minister for Foreign Affairs (b. 1925)
2014 – Tony Benn, English politician, Postmaster General of the United Kingdom (b. 1925)
  2014   – Meir Har-Zion, Israeli commander (b. 1934)
2016 – John W. Cahn, German-American metallurgist and academic (b. 1928)
  2016   – Peter Maxwell Davies, English composer and conductor (b. 1934)
  2016   – Suranimala Rajapaksha, Sri Lankan lawyer and politician (b. 1949)
2018 – Jim Bowen, English stand-up comedian and TV personality (b. 1937)
  2018   – Marielle Franco, Brazilian politician and human rights activist (b. 1979)
  2018   – Stephen Hawking, English physicist and author (b. 1942)
  2018   – Liam O'Flynn, Irish uileann piper (b. 1945)
2019 – Jake Phelps, American skateboarder and Thrasher editor-in-chief (b. 1962)
  2019   – Charlie Whiting, British motorsport director (b. 1952)
  2019   – Haig Young, Canadian politician (b. 1928)
2022 – Scott Hall, Professional wrestler (b. 1958)

Holidays and observances
Christian feast day:
Leobinus
Matilda of Ringelheim
March 14 (Eastern Orthodox liturgics)
Constitution Day (Andorra)
Heroes' Day (Saint Vincent and the Grenadines)
Mother Tongue Day (Estonia)
Nanakshahi New Year, first day of the month of Chet (Sikhism)
Pi Day
Summer Day (Albania)
White Day on which men give gifts to women; complementary to Valentine's Day (Japan and other Asian nations)

References

External links

 BBC: On This Day
 
 Historical Events on March 14

Days of the year
March